"Gone till November" is the third single released from Haitian rapper Wyclef Jean's debut solo album, The Carnival (1997). It peaked at number three on the UK Singles Chart, becoming Jean's highest-charting solo hit in the UK alongside 2000's "It Doesn't Matter". In the United States, the song peaked at number seven on the Billboard Hot 100 chart. It also reached number four in both Canada and New Zealand.

Composition
The orchestral accompaniment, which was arranged and conducted by Sonny Kompanek, was performed by the New York Philharmonic Orchestra.

Remix
The remix of "Gone till November" features R. Kelly and Canibus, with backing vocals by Destiny's Child, and contains interpolations of the songs "Michelle" by the Beatles and "Karma Chameleon" by Culture Club. A separate music video was also made for the remix version.

Music video
The music video, directed by Francis Lawrence, was filmed at Los Angeles International Airport (LAX) on 20 November 1997, and released in December 1997. It features a cameo appearance by Bob Dylan when Wyclef sings, "knockin' on heaven's door like I'm Bob Dylan." Canibus and Destiny's Child make appearances respectively, but R. Kelly does not.

Chart performance
"Gone till November" peaked at number seven on the US Billboard Hot 100 and spent a total of 20 weeks on the chart. It also peaked at number nine on the US Hot R&B/Hip-Hop Songs chart. In the UK, the song debuted at number three on the UK Singles Chart and spent a total of nine weeks on the chart. This became Wyclef's highest-charting single on the chart. The single was eventually certified platinum by the Recording Industry Association of America (RIAA) for sales of over a million copies in the United States.

Track listings

US CD and cassette single; UK cassette single
 "Gone till November" (pop version) – 3:27
 "Gone till November" (The Makin' Runs remix) – 4:05

US maxi-CD single
 "Gone till November" (The Makin' Runs remix) – 4:05
 "No Airplay" – 4:42
 "Gone till November" (The Makin' Runs remix instrumental) – 3:42
 "No Airplay" (instrumental) – 4:38
 "Gone till November" (pop version) – 3:27

US 12-inch single
A1. "Gone till November" (The Makin' Runs remix) – 4:05
A2. "No Airplay" – 4:42
A3. "Gone till November" (LP version) – 3:27
B1. "Gone till November" (The Makin' Runs remix instrumental) – 3:42
B2. "No Airplay" (instrumental) – 4:38
B3. "Gone till November" (The Makin' Runs remix a cappella) – 4:58

European CD single
 "Gone till November" (radio edit) – 3:16
 "Gone till November" (The Makin' Runs remix) – 4:05

UK CD1
 "Gone till November" (album version) – 3:28
 "Gone till November" (pop version) – 3:27
 "No Airplay" – 4:42
 "Bubblegoose" (Bakin' Cake version) – 3:30

UK CD2
 "Gone till November" (The Makin' Runs remix) – 4:05
 "Gone till November" (The Makin' Runs remix instrumental) – 3:42
 "Guantanamera" (Roxanne, Roxanne / Oye Como Va remix) – 4:17
 "No Airplay – Men in Blue" (featuring Youssou N'Dour) – 4:46

Australian CD single
 "Gone till November" (radio edit) – 3:16
 "Gone till November" (The Makin' Runs remix) – 4:05
 "No Airplay" – 3:42
 "Gone till November" (The Makin' Runs remix instrumental) – 3:42

Charts

Weekly charts

Year-end charts

Certifications

Release history

References

Wyclef Jean songs
1997 songs
1997 singles
Columbia Records singles
Music videos directed by Francis Lawrence
Ruffhouse Records singles
Song recordings produced by Jerry Duplessis
Song recordings produced by Wyclef Jean
Songs written by Jerry Duplessis
Songs written by Wyclef Jean